Marinifilum flexuosum is a Gram-negative, facultatively anaerobic and moderately halophilic bacterium from the genus of Marinifilum which has been isolated from seawater from the Mediterranean Sea in Spain.

References

Bacteria described in 2013
Bacteroidia